Meritan Shabani (born 15 March 1999) is a German professional footballer who plays as an attacking midfielder for Swiss Super League club Grasshoppers.

Club career

Bayern Munich
In the 2017–18 season, Shabani joined the squad of Bayern Munich II. On 27 October 2017, he made his debut in the Regionalliga Bayern in a 1–1 home draw against FV Illertissen after coming on as a substitute in the 82nd minute for Fabian Benko.

On 28 April 2018, Shabani made his Bundesliga debut for the first team in a 4–1 home win against Eintracht Frankfurt, starting the match before being substituted off in the 56th minute for Thiago. On 9 May 2018, Shabani signed his first professional contract with Bayern, lasting two years until 30 June 2020.

Shabani scored his first goal for the reserve team on 5 August 2018, scoring the second goal of the match in the 45th minute of the 2–0 home win against FV Illertissen.

Wolverhampton Wanderers
On 8 August 2019, Shabani signed a three-year contract with Premier League club Wolverhampton Wanderers. Wolves reportedly paid a €1.5 million transfer fee. He made his Wolves debut as a substitute on 25 September 2019 against Reading in the 2019–20 EFL Cup third round but was stretchered off injured after less than ten minutes being on the pitch. On 27 September 2019, it was confirmed that Shabani had ruptured the anterior cruciate ligament in his right knee, requiring surgery and lengthy rehabilitation, and was therefore likely to miss the rest of the 2019–20 season.

Loan at VVV-Venlo
On 1 February 2021, Shabani signed for Eredivisie side VVV-Venlo for the remainder of the season, and a possible extension for the next season.

Grasshoppers
On 7 July 2022, Shabani signed a two-year contract with Swiss Super League club Grasshoppers, along with his Wolves teammate Renat Dadashov. He made his debut on 24 July 2022, Grasshopper's first game of the season, coming on in the last minute of regular time. He received his first starting lineup nomination on 13 August 2023, in a 2–2 away draw against FC Sion. 

He did not have an easy start at his new club, being allowed to only start in one more game before the winter break. After the break, he began to start more regularly, being nominated four times in a row. He repaid this trust with his first goal on 18 March 2023, scoring the opener in a 1–2 away victory against FC Sion.

International career
In November 2016, Shabani received a call-up from Germany national under-18 team for a training camp with two friendly matches against the Republic of Ireland and the Netherlands, remaining unused on the bench in both matches. In 2018, Shabani played twice in the 2018–19 Under 20 Elite League for Germany U20s.

Personal life
Shabani was born in Munich, Bavaria, Germany from  Kosovan parents from Shtime.

Career statistics

Honours
Bayern Munich
Bundesliga: 2017–18, 2018–19

Bayern Munich II
Regionalliga Bayern: 2018–19
3. Liga: 2019–20

References

External links

1999 births
Living people
Footballers from Munich
German footballers
Germany youth international footballers
German people of Kosovan descent
German expatriate footballers
German expatriate sportspeople in England
German expatriate sportspeople in the Netherlands
German expatriate sportspeople in Switzerland
Kosovan footballers
Kosovan expatriate footballers
Kosovan expatriate sportspeople in England
Kosovan expatriate sportspeople in the Netherlands
Kosovan expatriate sportspeople in Switzerland
Association football midfielders
Regionalliga players
3. Liga players
FC Bayern Munich II players
Bundesliga players
FC Bayern Munich footballers
Wolverhampton Wanderers F.C. players

Grasshopper Club Zürich players